Bangladesh–Sweden relations refers to interstate relations between Bangladesh and Sweden. Bangladesh maintains an embassy in Stockholm, a Swedish embassy is located in Dhaka.

High level visits
Deputy Prime Minister Isabella Lövin visited Bangladesh in November 2014. On 15–16 June 2017, Bangladeshi Prime Minister Sheikh Hasina visited Sweden and met with Swedish Prime Minister Stefan Löfven, Minister for Development Cooperation, Isabella Lövin and Minister of Trade, Ann Linde. In November 2017, Foreign Minister Margot Wallström visited the capital Dhaka and refugee camps in Cox's Bazar.

Diplomatic ties
As of May 2019, Bangladesh maintains an embassy in Stockholm. The embassy is headed by ambassador Md. Nazmul Islam, who is also ambassador to Norway and Finland.

References 

 
Bangladesh
Sweden